Verifi is a payment protection and management firm founded in 2005.  It is based in Los Angeles, California, and has close to 9000 accounts.

History

Matthew Katz, Verifi’s founder and CEO, started the company after developing a customized solution that systematically identifies multiple types of payment risk. Katz initially started a successful business while still in college and saw subsequent success as an entrepreneur, having founded and partnered several other businesses and consulting firms. Mr. Katz is a graduate of Washington University in St. Louis with a degree in Economics.

Process
The company’s primary product offering is Cardholder Dispute Resolution Network (CDRN), which helps connect financial organizations and merchants, allowing merchants to act in real time to issue refunds, work to clear up equivocal transaction histories, or initiate traditional chargeback procedures.

In April 2017, Verifi launched Order Insight, a collaboration platform that connects cardholders, merchants and issuers to resolve billing confusion and disputes in real time. Through the platform, order details are made available to consumers via their card issuer. If a consumer elects to contact the issuing bank, their call center or back office personnel have access to the same order details and compelling evidence.

Industries
Verifi works within most retail-related industries, with omni-channel and e-commerce merchants, and maximizes "payment yield" across the entire transaction life-cycle.

References

External links
 Official Website

Payment service providers
Online payments
Credit cards in the United States
Companies based in Los Angeles
Financial services companies established in 2005
Financial services companies of the United States